BraveStarr is a 1987 action game developed by Probe Software and published under U.S. Gold's Go! label. Based on the animated series and toyline of the same name, the player assumes the role of Marshal BraveStarr.

The game received generally negative reviews from video game critics.

Gameplay

Development
BraveStarr was published by Probe Software and developed under US Gold's Go! label.

Reception

BraveStarr received negative reviews from video game critics.

References

External links
 

1987 video games
Action video games
Amstrad CPC games
Commodore 64 games
Europe-exclusive video games
U.S. Gold games
Space Western video games
Video games about police officers
Video games based on animated television series
Video games set on fictional planets
ZX Spectrum games
Video games developed in the United Kingdom